Jean-Philippe Fleurian and Guillaume Raoux were the defending champions but did not compete that year.

Thomas Enqvist and Magnus Larsson won in the final 6–3, 6–4 against Olivier Delaître and Fabrice Santoro.

Seeds

  David Adams /  Menno Oosting (semifinals)
  Neil Broad /  Piet Norval (quarterfinals)
  Tomás Carbonell /  Francisco Roig (quarterfinals)
  John-Laffnie de Jager /  Andrei Olhovskiy (first round)

Draw

External links
 Main Draw on ATP Archive

Open 13
1997 ATP Tour